The 2016 Salt Lake County mayoral election were held to elect the Mayor of Salt Lake County, Utah on November 8, 2016, alongside the presidential, House of Representatives, Senate and gubernatorial elections. This marked the fifth election to the office since the post was created in 2000.

Incumbent Democratic County Mayor Ben McAdams ran and won re-election to a second term against Republican Candidate David Robinson.

Candidates

Democratic Party
 Ben McAdams, incumbent County Mayor

Republican Party
 David Robinson, business consultant

Polling

Results

References

Salt Lake County mayoral
2016 United States mayoral elections
2010s in Salt Lake City